Baldassarri is a surname. Notable people with the surname include:

 Lorenzo Baldassarri (born 1996), Italian motorcycle racer
 Mario Baldassarri (born 1946), Italian economist and politician
 Milena Baldassarri (born 2001), Italian individual rhythmic gymnast
 Sebastián Baldassarri, Argentine para-athlete